Sheesharam Singh ( – 29 December 2019) was an Indian politician from Uttar Pradesh belonging to Bahujan Samaj Party. He was a member of the Uttar Pradesh Legislative Assembly.

Biography
Singh was elected as a member of the  Uttar Pradesh Legislative Assembly from Najibabad in 2007. He was a graduate.

Singh died on 29 December 2019.

References

2019 deaths
Bahujan Samaj Party politicians
Members of the Uttar Pradesh Legislative Assembly
People from Bijnor district
1940s births
Bahujan Samaj Party politicians from Uttar Pradesh